Syrian Jewish cuisine is the cuisine of the Syrian Jews. Although almost all Jews had left Syria by 2016, their cuisine has been preserved in books and family recipes.

History and influences 
Since biblical times there have been Jews in the area comprising modern-day Syria. Syrian Jewish cuisine is distinct from Ashkenazi Jewish cuisine foods like gefilte fish, knish, or other dishes more familiar as Jewish in the United States, whose Jewish community was overwhelmingly Ashkenazi. In fact, in the diaspora Syrian Jewish dishes often differ from those of other Jews because they contain rice and dried fruits and other seasonings not found in other regional Jewish foodway.  Because Jews are prohibited to mix meat and dairy, Syrian Jewish cuisine differed from standard Syrian cuisine because it used oil instead of butter or lamb fat in fried foods. After 1492 when the Sephardim were expelled from Spain, many Sephardic Jews came to Syria and brought a few dishes with Spanish names like bastel. Some immigrants from Italy in the seventeenth and eighteenth centuries (the so-called Francos) brought with them Italian dishes such as calsone (a sort of cheese ravioli). These foods were intermixed with the local Syrian Mizrahi and Musta'arabi Jewish cuisine creating new flavors and styles. Syrian Jews also improved versions of Syrian dishes, by emphasizing fruit and sweet-sour flavors. The Syrian Jews of Aleppo also made heavy use of tamarind. In fact tamarind based sauces are distinctively unique to Syrian Jewish cuisine.

Elements 
Characteristic of the Middle East and the Indo-Mediterranean Basin, Syrian Jewish cuisine contains many elements of cuisines from a wide geographic area. Moorish and Iberian elements arrived after Jews were expelled from Spain in 1492. Syrian Jewish merchants trading along the spice route also imported spices from the Far East and land of Persia, making rose water and lime an important addition to their cuisine.  Naturally, elements of Syrian Jewish cuisine were adopted by non-Jewish communities in Syria while Syrian Jews also adopted non-Jewish Syrian flavors into their dishes.  Syrian Jewish dishes differ in very specific ways from other Syrian cuisines.  The addition of cinnamon, cumin and allspice to dishes, as well as the use of Moroccan saffron with Persian olives and preserved lemons help to distinguish the cuisine from standard Syrian foods.

See also 

 Arab cuisine
 Syrian cuisine
 Central Asian cuisine
 Israeli cuisine
 Jewish dietary laws
 Levantine cuisine
 Mediterranean cuisine

References

Other References
 http://www.imageusa.com/index.php/community-articles/442.html?task=view
 https://www.amazon.ca/Aromas-Aleppo-Legendary-Cuisine-Syrian/dp/0060888180
 http://articles.sfgate.com/2007-09-12/food/17259961_1_poopa-dweck-syrian-jews-aleppo-pepper
 http://www.ewtn.com/library/chistory/syriahis.htm
 https://www.amazon.com/Fistful-Lentils-Jennifer-F-Abadi/dp/1558322183#reader_1558322183
 http://www.fistfuloflentils.com/SY_Cooking.html
 
 https://www.npr.org/2008/04/16/89659889/a-seder-with-a-syrian-flavor
 http://www.cookingjewish.com/node/78
 https://www.nytimes.com/2007/09/05/dining/05book.html

Syria
Syria
Syrian cuisine
Jewish cuisine
 Cuisine
Mizrahi Jewish cuisine
Sephardi Jewish cuisine